Sandakan Airport  is a domestic airport which serves Sandakan in Sandakan District, Sabah, Malaysia. In 2005, the airport handled 621,513 passengers and registered 10,876 flights.

History

World War II
The site was selected during World War II for a Royal Air Force (RAF) airfield, but by the time of the Japanese invasion of Borneo, work had not progressed beyond clearing the area of vegetation. After the Fall of Singapore, the Japanese military decided that its aircraft needed a refuelling stop between peninsular Malaya and the Philippines and decided to complete the RAF airfield site. The Japanese Army transferred some 1,500 British and Australian prisoners of war from Singapore to work on the airfield. Commencing in August 1942, the prisoners, along with thousands of Javanese- and local labourers, built the airfield by hand, including a  runway, on a site composed of tufa. The airfield received its first flight in December 1942, when General Yamawaki Masataka landed in a bomber aircraft and declared the airfield open. At various times in 1945, all remaining prisoners of war were evacuated from the vicinity of the airfield, with all but six dying during what became known as the Sandakan Death Marches.

Expansion plan
On 7 May 2017, Prime Minister Najib Razak announced an allocation of RM 80 million for the airport runway extension project. The extension project commenced in 2019, but completion is delayed due to the COVID-19 pandemic.

During a meeting with Sabah's Chief Minister  Hajiji Noor , Wee Ka Siong the Malaysia Minister of Transport in December 2021 told that the runway extension project will be completed really soon.

In June 2022 the extended runway has been completed along with the adjacent Taxiway Bravo. Runway 08 is equipped with ILS while runway 26 has VOR and RNAV approaches are available.

The new runway length of 2500M(8202feet) allows unrestricted payload take off for narrowbody aircraft like the B737-800, A320, A321. This also allows operations of widebody aircraft like A330 though subjected to either payload or range restrictions.

Airlines and destinations

Traffic and statistics

Statistics

References

 Silver, Lynette Ramsay: Sandakan: A Conspiracy of Silence; Opus Publications, Malaysia.

External links

 Sandakan Airport, Sabah at Malaysia Airports Holdings Berhad
 Sandakan Airport Real Time Flight Schedule
 
 

Buildings and structures in Sandakan
Airports in Sabah